Sheraton Huzhou Hot Spring Resort is a luxury hotel and resort located in Huzhou, China. It has nicknames such as "Horseshoe Hotel" and "Doughnut Hotel" due to its Torus geometrical shape. The horseshoe-shaped hotel, 10-story structure lies on Lake Tai between Nanjing and Shanghai. The 4½-star resort has 321 rooms, 37 villas, 40 suites, a presidential suite, parking facilities, fitness & wellness center, four restaurants, a café, a children's pool, and rooms with terraces. The design was conceived by architect Yansong Ma and constructed by the Shanghai Feizhou Group. It is a franchise of Sheraton Hotels and Resorts.
Completed in 2013, the building was awarded 3rd place from the Emporis Skyscraper Awards, siting it as the third best "new skyscraper for design and functionality" completed that year.

References 

2013 establishments in China
Buildings and structures in Huzhou
Hotels established in 2013
Hotel buildings completed in 2013
Hotels in China
Sheraton hotels
Skyscraper hotels in China
Ma Yansong buildings